Even Gabrielsen Wetten (born 12 August 1982 in Hamar) is a Norwegian speed skater. He became World Champion on 1,000 metres in 2005 in Inzell.

He retired 3 October 2007, only 25 years old, due to injuries and motivational issues.

References
Even Wetten at SkateResults.com
Photos of Even Wetten

1982 births
Living people
Norwegian male speed skaters
Olympic speed skaters of Norway
Speed skaters at the 2006 Winter Olympics
Sportspeople from Hamar